Noodle is a fictional Japanese musician, singer, and member of the British virtual band Gorillaz. She provides the lead guitar and keyboards, as well as some occasional vocals for the band. Like all other band members of Gorillaz, she was created in 1998 by Damon Albarn and Jamie Hewlett.  Noodle has been voiced by Haruka Kuroda, Miho Hatori of Cibo Matto, and Haruka Abe.

Development

Characterization
Noodle was originally conceptualised by co-creator Jamie Hewlett as a 17-year-old girl named Paula Cracker, but co-creator Damon Albarn noted that the character was too similar to the characters that Hewlett is typically known for drawing, and recommended that he attempt to create "something different". Taking Albarn's advice, Hewlett designed an illustration of a 10-year-old Japanese girl named Noodle.

Jamie Hewlett has stated in interviews that Noodle is his favourite Gorillaz character. She was created by Hewlett and Albarn in 1998 and made her first official appearance in Gorillaz' debut EP Tomorrow Comes Today in 2000.

Voice
Noodle has had her singing and speaking voices provided by several people over the years. In the band's 2001 self-titled debut album, her singing voice was originally provided by Cibo Matto singer Miho Hatori, and her speaking voice was originally provided by actress Haruka Kuroda, who performed as a backing vocalist for Gorillaz' 2001 tour. Hatori was suggested as the singing voice of Noodle by producer Dan the Automator, who had previously worked with her for a track by Handsome Boy Modeling School. Her vocals for "19-2000" were sometimes provided by Humanz collaborator Kilo Kish (from the track "Out of Body") when the song was performed on the Humanz Tour. Noodle is depicted as the lead vocalist for the Demon Days single "Dare", in which the vocals were actually provided by R&B singer Roses Gabor (aka Rosie Wilson). In 2016, Gabor re-recorded her vocals for "Dare" for a version of the song called "Dare (Hold it Down)" recorded by English artist DJ Friction, which was approved by Albarn. Gabor has since performed with Gorillaz as a backup vocalist on the Humanz single "Andromeda". Since 2018, Noodle's speaking voice has been provided by Japanese-English actress Haruka Abe. In the Gorillaz era of the band, Noodle had little knowledge of the English language and spoke exclusively in Japanese until the Demon Days era of Gorillaz. When she first started speaking English, she spoke the language with a rather distinctive Japanese accent that has gradually lessened as she got older, with her accent sounding more British as an adult. Noodle regularly switches back and forth between English and Japanese in conversation, speaking in a regional dialect called Osaka-ben in her native tongue. As a child, Noodle's speaking voice was louder and higher pitched, but has since softened and mildly lowered as an adult.

Fictional history
Noodle was born in Osaka, Japan on 31 October 1990.

Noodle first came to Gorillaz in 1998 shortly after their original guitarist and 2-D's ex-girlfriend Paula Cracker was removed from the band’s lineup for having an affair with Murdoc Niccals in the bathroom of Gorillaz' fictional headquarters at Kong Studios. As a result, the band was left without a guitarist, which led them to run an advertisement in a newspaper in search of a new one. Later the same day, a FedEx crate arrived at Kong Studios, and a Japanese girl leaped out and began playing a very loud solo on her guitar. After shredding on her guitar, she spoke a single word to the trio; "Noodle", which would then become her nickname.

In 2003, Noodle visited Japan in an attempt to uncover her past after being haunted by disturbing nightmares while on tour. She regained her lost memories in a restaurant after hearing the trigger words "ocean bacon". She coincidentally met with her mentor, Mr. Kyuzo, who was working as the head chef in the restaurant. Kyuzo helped her make sense of her lost memories and revealed to her that she was a participant in a top secret government supersoldier project, and was trained with a specialty in musicianship, mastering many weapons, languages, and musical instruments, with a distinct forte in the guitar as a result of the program. He disclosed to her that out of the 23 children created for the project, she was the only one to survive and the others were all killed by the government when the project was scrapped, with Kyuzo shipping Noodle to the United Kingdom in a FedEx crate after wiping her memory clean. Kyuzo purposefully sent Noodle to Gorillaz as he believed she would be able to perform relatively obscurely. After this revelation, she was suddenly able to speak English after not having any knowledge of the language for years.

Following this, Noodle returned home to Kong Studios to begin writing rough demos for a second Gorillaz album, which would end up being Demon Days. When she returned to Kong, she saw that the studio became infested by zombies and the undead after a disease occupied the studio due to it being abandoned for a year. Over the span of six months, Noodle rid the studio of the zombie infestation while hiding in the TV room of Kong. During her time in the TV room, Noodle used her recovered knowledge of the English language to do extensive research on the state of the world, in which she identified a lack of substance in entertainment that she figuratively referred to as "the real infection", which would become her main inspiration for the concept of Demon Days. As she began to finish up the demos, 2-D, Murdoc, and Russel Hobbs one-by-one began to return to Kong and recording of the album was ready to begin. After Demon Days release and worldwide success, Noodle was assumed dead and in hell by the characters following her appearance in the music video for "El Mañana" in 2006, which appears to show the flying windmill island from the "Feel Good Inc." music video being gunned down by two attack helicopters.

Noodle was said to have gone on a journey to reunite with Gorillaz in 2010 after four years of alleged absence from the group since 2006. She was shown arriving at Plastic Beach with a giant Russel in a storyboard for a scrapped "Rhinestone Eyes" music video. During Noodle's absence, Murdoc replaced her with a cyborg replica named Cyborg Noodle that he created using a strand of her hair that he found in the rubbish from the crash in the "El Mañana" music video. Noodle, like Russel, had no spoken dialogue during the Plastic Beach era of Gorillaz, despite eventually reuniting with the band.

In Gorillaz' 2016 interactive short story "The Book of Noodle", it was revealed that years after Plastic Beach, Noodle defeated a shape-shifting demon from hell that she accidentally released named Mazuu while in Tokyo, Japan. She then shipped herself to West London in a FedEx crate in the escape following the battle with the creature to reunite with the band. In The Now Now, Noodle visits Patagonia in South America as per an incarcerated Murdoc's request to confront El Mierda, who he claimed framed him for drug smuggling. In a 2018 advertisement campaign for a Gorillaz line of G-Shock watches called "Mission M101" following Murdoc's release, Noodle and 2-D were interviewed by the G-Shock's founder Kikuo Ibe.

On 12 September 2019, Noodle sent the first in a set of postcards that the band sent to each other while on vacation in different areas of the world and posted it to their social media accounts with the others following soon after. Noodle sent her postcard from Lake Urmia, Iran and stated that she intends to visit various places across the world before climate change destroys them, asking the other members if they had the parts to a machine gathered. The machine Noodle was referring to would later be revealed to be for the Song Machine, the latest audiovisual project from Gorillaz.

Personality
Noodle has shown herself to be very pensive and reflective over the years, often contemplating on the state of the world around her, especially in interviews promoting the band's 2005 album Demon Days, of which she is said to have led the creation. Because of this, she is a large portion of the spoken dialogue on the 2005 Gorillaz press interview CD "We Are The Dury" to explain the process behind the album's creation. She is generally introverted and usually most at peace when residing in her own space. Although Noodle is generally reserved and collected, she has sometimes displayed occasional irritability and impatience when interacting with some of the other band members, especially as a teenager. Having her privacy invaded has been proven to be a major pet peeve. For Plastic Beach, Noodle was completely silent and didn't speak a word of dialogue, even after being shown reuniting with the band in the storyboard for "Rhinestone Eyes".

Noodle is a martial arts expert who often effortlessly partakes in dangerous action stunts with ease, and has been described as "kick riffmeister" and an "Asian axe princess" by the band. She is a Buddhist and has mentioned having a particularly strong zen-bond with bandmate 2-D. As a millennial, Noodle has shown herself to be tech savvy and in-tune with current trends while still being interested in more esoteric media. She often offers words of enlightenment and philosophical phrases, and has shown herself to be wise and intelligent. In the 2016 Jaguar Racing campaign featuring Noodle, she showed a particular interest in engineering.

As an adult now entering her early thirties, despite still being the youngest member of Gorillaz, she has been displayed as being one of the more emotionally mature members of the group, to the point of referring  to herself as the "big sister" of the band, as she often protects the other band members when they are in danger and comforts them when they are distressed. This aspect of Noodle is displayed in the Song Machine episode "Aries", where Noodle abruptly stops her ride and expresses a concern for 2-D (who is riding with Murdoc) to Russel via a text message in the middle of a race between the band members. In the cover art for "Aries", Noodle attempts to pull Russel off of Murdoc after he beats him up for injuring 2-D.

Physical appearance
Noodle is a short and thin Japanese woman with short hair and almond-shaped eyes. Her skin generally has a warm olive tone and she tends to wear a small amount of makeup, which usually consists of painted fingernails and eye shadow. Noodle's hair is short and its colour is generally either dark purple or black, but she has occasionally dyed her hair, such as in the music video for "Tranz". In the Gorillaz era of the band, Noodle was designed with exaggerated stereotypical Asian features such as her skin tone, overbite, and exaggerated epicanthic folds, although this element of Noodle has been mostly eliminated since Demon Days. In Demon Days art, Noodle's eyes were frequently covered by her hair, and Plastic Beach artwork portrays Noodle wearing a butterfly mask that covers her face. When Noodle's eyes in this era were sometimes designed without epicanthic folds, they were pitch black and appeared to be hollow. Her hair began to be designed with a dark purple color in Demon Days than the black color that it previously was in Gorillaz, and in Plastic Beach, Noodle started to be shown in makeup more frequently.

Fashion
Noodle and the rest of Gorillaz are regularly illustrated as wearing different wardrobe and the clothing she is depicted in changes often, which is rare in cartoons. In Gorillaz artwork, Noodle's clothing almost exclusively consisted of classic kimono jackets on top of kimono shirts with matching wide leg shorts, slip-on shoes and a radio helmet. In artwork for Demon Days, Noodle's clothing became more varied, and she most commonly wore two toned striped sweatshirts with jeans and boots, sometimes shown wearing crop tops or a kimono jacket. In Plastic Beach artwork, Noodle was most frequently depicted wearing a nurse dress and a scarf with striped knee high socks, gloves, and a butterfly mask, while Cyborg Noodle wore a security guard uniform. The artwork for Humanz mainly portrays Noodle in wardrobe that was inspired by the Black Panther Party and Sandinista National Liberation Front, and in artwork for The Now Now, Noodle was mostly depicted in jackets over crop tops with shorts or a skirt. While the music video for "Saturnz Barz" shows Noodle in a blue fur jacket and a black skirt with ankle boots and anaglyph glasses, she is shown in a cat outfit in the video for "Strobelite". Meanwhile, the music video for "Tranz" depicts Noodle in a pink crop top and a skirt with high heels and the music video for "Humility" shows Noodle wearing a pastel tank top with the phrase "Hello Kinky" printed on it.

Age
Originally designed as a 10-year-old in Gorillaz' 2001 debut album, Noodle and the rest of Gorillaz have since been depicted as getting progressively older with each Gorillaz album, and is portrayed today as an adult woman now entering her 30s. Since her debut in the Tomorrow Comes Today EP in 2000, Noodle has grown taller, obtained more mature facial features, and received a more toned physique as an adult. Her speaking voice has also become slightly lower and softer and her Japanese accent she previously had has disappeared since Humanz. Also since Humanz, Noodle (like 2-D) has had a slight change in nose shape, with her nose taking a more triangular form.

Role in Gorillaz
Noodle was designed as the guitarist, occasional keyboardist, and backup vocalist for Gorillaz. Noodle can play a wide array of other instruments as a result of her training from childhood, but generally sticks to her usual role as guitarist, sometimes depicted playing keyboard and performing additional or backup vocals on Gorillaz songs. Noodle sings additional vocals on the Gorillaz single "19-2000", and sings backing vocals on several other songs on the album.

The making of Demon Days is portrayed in-universe as being led by Noodle, although Murdoc would try to claim the credit for it. The original demo version of "Feel Good Inc." is dubbed "Noodle's Demo" in the iTunes exclusive single release of the song. She is also depicted as the lead vocalist and additional keyboardist in the music video for the 2006 Demon Days single "Dare". Being the lead musical director of Demon Days, she also came up with the ideas for the music videos. Noodle was not present for the making of Plastic Beach, instead being replaced by a cyborg replica of herself created by Murdoc named Cyborg Noodle. As such, she was also not present for the recording of The Fall, which frontman 2-D recorded largely by himself.

Other appearances
In October 2016, she became the global ambassador for Jaguar Racing, appearing in a short commercial advertising the company. The commercial features Noodle driving a Jaguar for a test run and subsequently giving her opinion of the car after she finished. On 24 November 2020, Noodle was announced as a juror for the Film/Video category of the 2020 Clio Awards. Noodle and the rest of the Gorillaz members appear on the back cover of Jamie Hewlett's 2017 art book, alongside characters from all of Hewlett's projects.

See also
Rise of the Ogre

References

External links
US Magazine interview with Cyborg Noodle

Animated characters introduced in 1998
Animated human characters
Female characters in animation
Fictional Buddhists
Fictional characters invented for recorded music
Fictional child prodigies
Fictional child soldiers
Fictional female martial artists
Fictional female musicians
Fictional feminists and women's rights activists
Fictional guitarists
Fictional gynoids
Fictional Japanese people
Fictional rock musicians
Fictional singers
Fictional soldiers
Fictional sole survivors
Fictional super soldiers
Fictional women soldiers and warriors
Gorillaz members